Kuroshima (黒島; Yaeyama: Ffusïma, Okinawan: Kurushima), also known as "Kuro Island", is an island in Taketomi Town, Okinawa, part of the Yaeyama archipelago. The island has the approximate shape of a heart symbol when viewed from the air, and is marketed as "Heart Island". The name means "Black Island".

Cattle raising is a major economic activity and a yearly "cow festival" is held. Sometimes the island is marketed as "Island of Cows" as well, as there are more cows than inhabitants living on it. Tourist activities include diving and sunbathing.

Sights
Kuroshima has various sights to offer:
A lighthouse stands at the southern tip.
In the Visitors' Center in the west of the island various old photos, stuffed animals and traditional fishing and agricultural equipment are on display.
Puzumari is an old tower built of dark coral stones close to the Visitors' Center. During the times of the Ryukyu Kingdom, the top of the tower was the highest point of the whole island, and it was used to observe the ships going to and from Ishigaki and to send fire signals to the neighbouring island.  There are similar towers dating from the 17th century on other islands of the Yaeyama group as well, e.g. Hateruma.
Nakamoto Beach, the west coast of Kuroshima, is worth a visit as well. Impressive corals can be seen close to a small Shinto Shrine at low tide.
In the middle of Kuroshima there is a tower offering a scenic view of the whole island.
Several ruins consisting of dark coral stones overgrown with plants are scattered all over the island.
Traditional architecture is well preserved in the village in the middle of the island. Many houses which have a typical hip roof are still surrounded by walls built of dark coral stones.
The banana trees vegetate and bear fruit on the island helped by high temperatures.
Sea Turtle Association of Japan, Kuroshima Research Station

Infrastructure
Kuroshima can be reached by ferry from Ishigaki several times a day. Bikes are for hire at the small harbour in the north of the island. All the sights can easily be reached on foot. There are several guest houses (minshuku) on Kuroshima. In the village, there is a shop and a post offices which serves as a bank as well.

Education
The Taketomi town authorities maintain a single combined elementary and junior high school on the island: Kuroshima Elementary and Junior High School (竹富町立黒島小中学校).

For public senior high school students may attend schools of the Okinawa Prefectural Board of Education.

References 

Islands of Okinawa Prefecture
Yaeyama Islands